Steffen Kriechbaum (born 3 January 1947) is an Austrian former breaststroke swimmer. He competed at the 1972 Summer Olympics and the 1976 Summer Olympics.

References

External links
 

1947 births
Living people
Austrian male breaststroke swimmers
Olympic swimmers of Austria
Swimmers at the 1972 Summer Olympics
Swimmers at the 1976 Summer Olympics
Sportspeople from Chemnitz
20th-century Austrian people